Oboronia punctatus, the common ginger white, is a butterfly in the family Lycaenidae. It is found in Guinea, Liberia, Ivory Coast, Ghana, Togo, Nigeria (south and the Cross River loop), Cameroon, the Republic of the Congo, Angola, the Central African Republic, the Democratic Republic of the Congo, western Uganda and north-western Tanzania. The habitat consists of forests.

Adults feed on the flowers of the larval host plant.

The larvae feed on Costus dubius and C. afer. They are associated with the ant species Pheidole aurivillii race kasaiensis and P. rotundata.

References

Butterflies described in 1879
Polyommatini
Butterflies of Africa
Taxa named by Hermann Dewitz